Hürth-Kalscheuren station is in the town of Hürth in the Rhein-Erft district in the German state of North Rhine-Westphalia. It is at the junction of the Eifel Railway with the West Rhine Railway. The station was built in 1859 at the initiative of the city of Hürth, but was renamed Hürth-Kalscheuren in 1991/2 as a result of a contribution of Deutsche Mark 14,000 from Kalscheuren.

Location 
Hürth-Kalscheuren station is located on the eastern edge of the city of Hürth in the district of Kalscheuren near the local television studios on the border of the city of Cologne.

North to the station’s track field is the southern exit from the container terminal of Cologne Eifeltor freight yard.

Hürth-Kalscheuren station is served by bus line 714 of Hürth public transport, connecting to the centre of Hürth and the Vorgebirgsbahn (literally “foothills railway”, now line 18 of the Cologne Stadtbahn) station Hürth-Hermülheim. Meschenich, which belongs to the Rodenkirchen district of Cologne, is connected by bus line 192 Monday through Friday mornings and afternoons/evenings.

Structure 

Hürth-Kalscheuren station is a junction station built on an island between the tracks. The station building is located between platform track 1 and track 51 and there are crossovers between the two tracks to the north and south of the station. In addition to the main platform, there are two island platforms, which lie between tracks 53 and 51 and between tracks 2 and 3.

Tracks 1 and 2 are located on the West Rhine Railway, which runs between Cologne, Bonn and Koblenz. Tracks 3 and 4 (which has no platform) are used to haul freight to Cologne-Ehrenfeld and Cologne-Nippes freight yard. Tracks 51 and 53 and some other tracks without platforms connect to the Eifel Railway, which branches off from the West Rhine Railway in Kalscheuren towards Kall and Gerolstein.

Services 
The station is served by Regionalbahn service RB 24, operated by DB Regio NRW on the Eifel Railway, and MRB 26, operated by TransRegio Deutsche Regionalbahn GmbH on the  East Rhine line, both running once an hour each way every day. Long-distance and Regional-Express trains pass through Hürth-Kalscheuren station without stopping. The hourly services on line RB 48 (Rhein-Wupper-Bahn) between Wuppertal-Oberbarmen and Bonn-Mehlem, operated by National Express Germany, also passed through the station without stopping until December 2015, but stop since then.

References

External links

Railway stations in North Rhine-Westphalia
Railway stations in Germany opened in 1859
Buildings and structures in Rhein-Erft-Kreis